The Ike Skelton National Defense Authorization Act for Fiscal Year 2011, is a law in the United States signed by President Barack Obama on January 7, 2011. As a bill it was originally  in the 111th Congress and later co-sponsored by Representative Ike Skelton as H.R. 6523 and renamed. The overall purpose of the law is to authorize funding for the defense of the United States and its interests abroad, for military construction, and for national security-related energy programs.

Commitments includes setting aside $205 million for the Iron Dome short-range rocket defense system for the State of Israel. Section 806 dealt with supply chain risk management, allowing restrictions on information made available under relevant procurement exercises where requirements for the protection of national security applied.

See also
National Defense Authorization Act
National Defense Authorization Act for Fiscal Year 2012

References

External links
*  Ike Skelton National Defense Authorization Act for Fiscal Year 2011 from the Library of Congress
 Ike Skelton National Defense Authorization Act for Fiscal Year 2011 from the Congressional Budget Office

National Defense Authorization Act for Fiscal Year 2011
Acts of the 111th United States Congress